Raudeberg is a village in Kinn Municipality in Vestland county, Norway. It is located on the east side of the island of Vågsøy. Nord-Vågsøy Church is located on the eastern edge of the village, right along the coast.

Raudeberg (historically spelled Rødberg) was the administrative centre of the former municipality of Nord-Vågsøy, which existed from 1910 until 1964. Today, it is the second largest settlement in the municipality, after the town of Måløy.

References

Villages in Vestland
Kinn